Tarsan Bridge is a bridge in Shan State, Burma. It crosses the Salween River. The Tarsan Hydroelectric Power Plant is reportedly being built in the area by a Thai firm which could potentially generate 7,100 megawatts of power.

References

Bridges in Myanmar
Buildings and structures in Shan State
Salween River